The Temple of Confucius, is a Confucian temple in Changhua City, Changhua County, Taiwan.

History
The temple was originally built in 1726. The complex previously included the county high school as well as the temple, but of the original buildings only the temple's central buildings remain. It was renovated in 1830. It is a Grade 1 national historical site.

Architecture
The two central columns of the temple were carved from white stones of Quanzhou, Fujian. The main element of the temple is a memorial tablet devoted to Confucius with wooden commemorative inscription written by President Chiang Ching-kuo of Republic of China and Qianlong Emperor of Qing Dynasty.

See also
 Kaihua Temple
 Nanyao Temple
 Shengwang Temple
 Yuanching Temple
 List of tourist attractions in Taiwan

References

1726 establishments in Taiwan
Changhua City
Changhua
Religious buildings and structures completed in 1726
Temples in Changhua County
Tourist attractions in Changhua County
National monuments of Taiwan